This is a list of seasons played by Walton Casuals Football Club in English football from the club entering semi-professional football in 1992 to the present day. It details the club's achievements in major competitions.

Season list

Key 

P – games played
W – games won
D – games drawn
L – games lost

F – goals for
A – goals against
Pts – points
Pos – final position

DNP – did not participate
PRE – preliminary round
QR1 – first qualifying round
QR2 – second qualifying round

R1 – first round
R2 – second round
R3 – third round
R4 – fourth round

QF – quarter-finals
SF – semi-finals
RUN - runners-up
WIN - winners

Full cup competition names

 Surrey Challenge Cup - Surrey County Premier League Challenge Cup
 Counties Challenge Cup - Combined Counties League Challenge Cup
 Southern Combination Cup - Southern Combination Challenge Cup

 SPC - To be confirmed
 RPC - To be confirmed

References

Seasons
Walton Casuals